Lawrence Jenkins or Larry Jenkins may refer to:
 Lawrence Hugh Jenkins (1857–1928), a British judge in India 
 Lawrence L. Jenkins (1924–2017), an American World War II pilot and prisoner of war
 Larry "Flash" Jenkins (1955–2019), an American film actor,  director, producer, and screenwriter